FC Dushanbe-83 is a football club based in Dushanbe in Tajikistan.

History
FC Dushanbe-83 earned promotion to the Tajikistan Higher League for the first time in 2019, after finishing third in the 2019 Tajikistan First League.

Domestic history

Current squad

References

External links

Football clubs in Tajikistan
Football clubs in Dushanbe